Achoerus is a genus of worms belonging to the family Convolutidae.

Species:
 Achoerus caspius Beklemischev, 1914 	 
 Achoerus ferox Beklemischev, 1937 
 Achoerus pachycaudatus Dörjes, 1968

References

Acoelomorphs